Conus vezoi is a species of sea snail, a marine gastropod mollusk in the family Conidae, the cone snails, cone shells or cones.

These snails are predatory and venomous. They are capable of "stinging" humans.

Description

Distribution
This marine species of cone snail occurs off Madagascar

References
Notes

Sources
 Filmer R.M. (2001). A Catalogue of Nomenclature and Taxonomy in the Living Conidae 1758 - 1998. Backhuys Publishers, Leiden. 388pp. 
 Bozzetti L. (2013) Darioconus pennaceus pseudoecho (Gastropoda: Prosobranchia: Conidae) new subspecies from southern Madagascar. Malacologia Mostra Mondiale 78: 9-10
 Monnier E., Batifoix J.L. & Limpalaër L. (2018). Darioconus rosiae (Gastropoda: Conidae) a new species of the Darioconus pennaceus complex from South-West Madagascar. Xenophora Taxonomy. 19: 9-24
 Monnier E., Tenorio M.J., Bouchet P. & Puillandre N. (2018). The cones (Gastropoda) from Madagascar “Deep South”: composition, endemism and new taxa. Xenophora Taxonomy. 19: 25-75
 Monnier E., Batifoix J.L. & Limpalaër L. (2018). Darioconus rosiae (Gastropoda: Conidae) a new species of the Darioconus pennaceus complex from South-West Madagascar. Xenophora Taxonomy. 19: 9-24.

External links
 Specimen in MNHN, Paris
 Holotype in MNHN, Paris

vezoi
Gastropods described in 2000